Belleri is an Italian surname. Notable people with the surname include:

Alessandro Belleri (born 1985), Italian footballer
Manuel Belleri (born 1977), Italian footballer

See also
 Agonum belleri,  a species of ground beetle in the Platyninae subfamily

Italian-language surnames